Russian emigration may refer to:

 White émigrés : Russians who emigrated from the territory of the former Russian Empire in the wake of the Russian Revolution (1917) and Russian Civil War (1917–1923).

 Russian emigration following the 2022 invasion of Ukraine